New Jasper Township is one of the twelve townships of Greene County, Ohio, United States. As of the 2010 census, the population was 2,568.

Geography
Located in the east central part of the county, it borders the following townships:
Cedarville Township - north
Ross Township - northeast
Silvercreek Township - southeast
Caesarscreek Township - south
Xenia Township - west

No municipalities are located in New Jasper Township, although part of the census-designated place of Shawnee Hills is located in the township's east.

Name and history
New Jasper Township was established in 1853.

It is the only New Jasper Township statewide.

Government
The township is governed by a three-member board of trustees, who are elected in November of odd-numbered years to a four-year term beginning on the following January 1. Two are elected in the year after the presidential election and one is elected in the year before it. There is also an elected township fiscal officer, who serves a four-year term beginning on April 1 of the year after the election, which is held in November of the year before the presidential election. Vacancies in the fiscal officership or on the board of trustees are filled by the remaining trustees.

Notable people
Darrell McCall, country music singer

References

External links
New Jasper Township official website
County website

Townships in Greene County, Ohio
Townships in Ohio
1853 establishments in Ohio
Populated places established in 1853